Kakisa (Slavey language: K’agee; between the willows) is a "Designated Authority" in the South Slave Region of the Northwest Territories, Canada. The community is located on Kakisa Lake, and is southeast of Fort Providence. Originally located at Tathlina Lake, the community moved, in 1962, to the present location in order to be closer to the Mackenzie Highway and is linked by a  all-weather road.

Demographics

The majority of the community reported First Nations status. The main languages in the community are South Slavey and English.

Services
Royal Canadian Mounted Police services are provided through Fort Providence and no health services are available. There is a single grocery store, the "River Front Convenience Store-Motel" which serves visitors to the nearby Lady Evelyn Falls. Education, up to Grade 9, is provided by Kakisa Lake School.

First Nations
The Dene of the community are represented by the Ka'a'gee Tu First Nation and belong to the Dehcho First Nations.

References

Communities in the South Slave Region
Dene communities